SportsCenter AM was a radio show on ESPN Radio hosted by ESPN Radio SportsCenter anchor Jay Reynolds. The show has been replaced by First and Last in July 2017. SportsCenter AM featured scores from all major sporting events including the NFL, NBA, NHL, and MLB. The show usually played audio highlights for last minute shots, game winning homers, and other exciting events from the previous day's sporting events. All the major games were discussed at least twice during the show in a score fashion outside of the SportsCenter breaks, and exciting matches were usually mentioned at least three times.

SportsCenter AM lasted one hour from 4:00 a.m. to 5:00 a.m. ET, re-airing at 5:00 am ET. The show led into Mike and Mike in the Morning. It ran much like the SportsCenter program on ESPN television. Reynolds recapped scores and plays audio highlights from a variety of sports. Interviews from earlier ESPN Radio shows in the previous day discussing what might happen in the game and postgame interviews shown on SportsCenter were also played. No live interviews or call-ins took place during the hour. Differences existed within the SportsCenter updates during the show. Instead of having an update every 20 minutes, Bob Picozzi only did one SportsCenter update at 4:30 a.m. A SportsCenter Express, hosted by Doug Brown, took place where the normal SportsCenter breaks would be, at 4:20 and 4:40 a.m.

References 

ESPN Radio programs